Gilmour may refer to:

Gilmour (surname), people with the surname Gilmour
Gilmour Academy, a K-12 college preparatory school in Gates Mills, Ohio, USA
Gilmour, Indiana, a small town in the United States
Gilmour (brand) owned by Fiskars (watering products, garden hoses, faucets and connectors)

See also

Gillmor
Gilmor
Gilmore (disambiguation)